John Glenday grew up in Monifieth.

Life
John lives in Angus, with his wife Erika.

His work appeared in Times Literary Supplement, London Review of Books, Poetry (Chicago), The Scotsman, The Guardian, Financial Times, Wascana Review, Ploughshares and Magma to name but a few.

John was shortlisted for the Ted Hughes Prize for Excellence in New Poetry and for the
Griffin Poetry Prize 2010 for his collection Grain.

His work is included in many anthologies such as the Faber Book of Twentieth Century Scottish Poetry (Faber and Faber 1992), Last Words: New Poetry for the New Century (Picador, 1999), New British Poetry (Grey Wolf Press, 2004), Contemporary poetry and contemporary science  (Oxford University Press, 2006), 100 Favourite Scottish Poems (Luath Press, 2006), 100 Favourite Scottish Love Poems (Luath Press, 2008), Being Human (Bloodaxe, 2011), Forward Book of Poetry 2016 (Faber & Faber, 2015) and Off the Shelf (Picador Poetry, 2018).

He was a judge for the 2011 National Poetry Competition, together with Jackie Kay and Colette Bryce.

The Golden Mean won the 2015 Roehampton Poetry Prize. It was also shortlisted for the Saltire Society Poetry Prize.

The American photographer Sally Mann used an excerpt from John's poem Landscape with Flying Mann for the title of her 2018 International Exhibition A Thousand Crossings. 

His Selected Poems was published by Picador Poetry in October 2020. The same year, he published 2 pamphlets: mira with Maria Isakova Bennett (Coast to Coast to Coast) and The Firth, published by Mariscat Press.

John can be heard in the Poetry Archive.

Awards
 Scottish Arts Council Book Prize for The Apple Ghost
Poetry Book Society Recommendation for Undark
Poetry Book Society Recommendation for Grain
Shortlisted for the Ted Hughes Award 2010 for Grain.
Shortlisted for The Griffin Poetry Prize 2010 for Grain
Winner of the 2015 Roehampton Poetry Prize 2015 for The Golden Mean.
Shortlisted for the Saltire Society Poetry Prize for The Golden Mean.

Poetry collections

References

External links
"John Glenday"
"Picador Poetry"
"Coast to Coast to Coast"
Mariscat Press
"Sally Mann - A thousand crossings"
Griffin Poetry Prize biography and video
"John Glenday", Literary Encyclopedia
"John Glenday's Grain", Scottish Poetry Library

"The Ugly", poem in The Valve, 22 May 2009
"Tin", The Guardian, 14 November 2009 

1952 births
Living people
Scottish poets
Academic staff of the University of Alberta
Alumni of the University of Edinburgh
People from Angus, Scotland